Green Templeton College (GTC) is a constituent college of the University of Oxford in the United Kingdom. The college is located on the former Green College site on Woodstock Road next to the Radcliffe Observatory Quarter in North Oxford and is centred on the architecturally important Radcliffe Observatory, an 18th-century building, modelled on the ancient Tower of the Winds at Athens. It is the university's second newest graduate college, after Reuben College, having been founded by the historic merger of Green College and Templeton College in 2008.

The college has a distinctive academic profile, specialising in subjects relating to human welfare and social, economic, and environmental well-being, including medical and health sciences, management and business, and most social sciences.

Green Templeton's sister college at the University of Cambridge is St Edmund's College.

History
The merger between Green College and Templeton College was the first of its kind in the university's modern history. It was announced formally in July 2007 following its approval by the University Council and the Governing Bodies of both colleges. Green Templeton College has always accepted both female and male students, as did both of its predecessors.

Although both Green College and Templeton College were young colleges by Oxford standards, they each had their own individual history and established culture.

Green College
Green College was founded in 1979 to bring together graduate students of medicine and related disciplines, and especially to encourage academic programmes in industry. It was named after its main benefactors: Cecil H. Green, founder of Texas Instruments, and his wife, Ida Green. It was one of three colleges established due to his generosity, the others being Green College, University of British Columbia, and The University of Texas at Dallas).

Of its student population, around 30% studied in the field of medicine, around 20% were engaged in postgraduate medical research, and other focuses included social work, environmental change and education studies.

Templeton College
Templeton College was founded in 1965 as the Oxford Centre for Management Studies under the chairmanship of Sir Norman Chester, Warden of Nuffield College, Oxford. Sir John Templeton provided an endowment to the centre in 1983 to raise professional standards in British management. This was one of the largest endowments ever made to a British educational establishment. The centre was later renamed Templeton College in his honour.

The college emphasised a commitment to lifelong individual development and aimed to bring together leaders in various fields to explore key issues in management and related policy areas. Its buildings at Egrove Park, in Kennington village near Oxford, were opened in 1969 and granted listed status in 1999. It was granted a royal charter and full college status in 1999.

Coat of arms
Green Templeton College's armorial bearings combine elements from the original coats of arms of both Green College and Templeton College, capturing the spirit of the history and character of each.

Its shield comprises two primary symbols: the rod of Aesculapius and the Nautilus shell. The former was the principal charge of Green College's coat of arms. (In Greek mythology, Aesculapius, the son of Apollo, was a medical practitioner. The serpent coiled around his staff symbolises the healing arts.) The Nautilus shell was chosen by Sir John Templeton, as symbolising evolution and renewal, and was adopted by Templeton College in 1984.

Green Templeton College's crest depicts a heraldic representation of the Sun behind the astronomical device for Venus (♀), acknowledging the historic transit of Venus across the Sun in 1761, which astronomical event prompted the foundation of the Radcliffe Observatory. The crest is blazoned:
(On a Helm with a Wreath Or and Vert) In front of a Sun in splendour the rays voided Or the Astrological Symbol for Venus Vert.

Buildings and grounds

The Radcliffe Observatory

The college is located on the three-acre (1.2 ha) site on Woodstock Road in North Oxford that previously housed Green College. It is centred on the architecturally important Radcliffe Observatory, an 18th-century, Grade I listed building, modelled on the ancient Tower of the Winds in Athens.

The observatory was built at the suggestion of Thomas Hornsby, the Savilian Professor of Astronomy at the university, after he had used his room in the Bodleian Tower to observe the transit of Venus across the Sun's disc in 1769. The transit was a notable event which helped to produce greatly improved measurements for nautical navigation. The observatory was built with funds from the trust of John Radcliffe, whose considerable estate had already financed a new quadrangle for his old college (University College, Oxford) as well as the Radcliffe Library (now the Radcliffe Camera) and the Radcliffe Infirmary.

Building began in 1772 to plans by the architect Henry Keene, but only Observer's House is his design. Upon Keene's death in 1776, the observatory was completed to a different design by James Wyatt. Wyatt based his design on an illustration of the Tower of the Winds in Athens that had appeared in Stuart and Revett's Antiquities of Athens, published in 1762.

Atop the observatory rests the Tower of Winds. Beneath the tower are three levels, with rooms on each level. The ground floor is today used as the college dining room. The first floor was originally the library, but is now the Graduate Common Room. The third floor is an octagonal observation room, which is now empty except for some of the original furniture.

The observatory was a functioning observatory from 1773 until its owners, the Radcliffe Trustees, sold it in 1934 to Lord Nuffield, who then presented it to the Radcliffe Hospital. In 1936, Lord Nuffield established the Nuffield Institute for Medical Research there. In 1979, the Nuffield Institute relocated to the John Radcliffe Hospital and the observatory was taken over by Green College.

The Norham Gardens site

A short walk from Green Templeton's main buildings is 13 Norham Gardens. In 1905 Sir William Osler was appointed to the Regius Professorship of Medicine at Oxford. In 1907, Sir William acquired 13 Norham Gardens, one of the finest houses in Oxford at the time. During the fourteen years of his Regius Professorship, Osler made Norham Gardens a meeting place for academics from all over the world. It became a favourite of medical students, physicians, and scientists, even receiving the label of 'The Open Arms' for the warmth it exuded.

After Osler, 13 Norham Gardens was occupied by another Regius Professor, Sir George White Pickering, and after him the Regius Professor Sir Richard Doll, who was the last Regius Professor to live there. The property of 13 Norham Gardens was then acquired by Green College.

Today, Norham Gardens houses the Osler-McGovern Centre. The Centre promotes the art and science of medicine through its workshops, conferences, visiting scholars and post-doctoral Fellows. It follows in Sir William Osler's footsteps by uniting scholars, lecturers and academics. It is also home to the Reuters Institute for the Study of Journalism (RISJ), established in 2006.

Housing
Green Templeton College has housing on the main site and various annexes. On-site housing includes the Doll Building (built in 1981) with 30 student rooms, Walton Building with 3 student rooms, Observer's House with 13 student rooms and New Block with 4 student rooms. Furthermore, the college has various student rooms in the Lord Napier House (Observatory Street), 2- and 3-bedroomed terraced houses in Observatory Street, various student rooms on St Margaret's Road, 1- and 2-bedroom flats in Rewley Abbey Court and 1- and 2-bedroom flats in Norham Gardens.

Facilities
Green Templeton also provides laundry facilities, a lecture theatre (the Abraham Lecture Theatre), a seminar/presentation room (the Barclay Room), and a computing room with 6 Windows computers. There are two 24-hour-access libraries on-campus: a management library (Management Studies Library) and a medical/social science library (Medical Library). The Management Studies Library is adjacent to the Observer's House, and the Medical Library is adjacent to the Radcliffe Observatory. Since August 2014, Green Templeton has an on-site 171 square meter gym with rowing machines, spinning bikes, threadmills and weights located between the main site and Observatory street.

Future developments
In the next phase of development, the area to the north-east of the college is to be developed, allowing for the extension of the college's academic departments and residential accommodation.

Student life
As a graduate college, it has a single common room, known as the Graduate Common Room ("GCR") – equivalent to the Middle Common Room ("MCR") in other colleges – to encourage interaction between students and fellows.

Green Templeton offers a wide variety of activities to its students. The various Green Templeton College clubs and societies include the Boat Club, the Book Club, Choir, Golf Society, LGBT Society, Medical Anthropology Society, Richard Doll Society, and Music Society. College events include the annual college Garden Party, the Summer Ball, the Human Welfare Conference, "Welfare and Wine", formals, and themed "bops" (discos or college parties), held throughout the year. Lecture series are routinely held for those interested, including the Green Templeton Lectures and those held by the Reuter's Institute.

The college is also active in various sports, especially rowing. It co-owns a boathouse on the River Isis with a sizeable fleet, and Green Templeton Boat Club has been competing successfully since its establishment in 2008. Other sports at Green Templeton College include badminton, basketball, cricket, croquet, football, golf, netball, rugby, running, squash and tennis. The college also has on-site tennis and squash courts. In addition to this, all students of the college are entitled to free membership at the Iffley Road Sports Centre.

The college bar, known as the Stables Bar, is open for drinks in the evenings, and serves as a meeting place during the day.

Green Templeton is actively involved in charity work, supporting a local and an overseas charity every year. Both the Graduate Common Room and the College Charity Committee organise numerous events throughout the year, both at Green Templeton College and in Oxford.

Green Templeton College's strong ties with the clinical medicine community are fostered through its affiliation with Osler House. Osler House is Oxford University's club for medical students and is open to students and Fellows involved in research in a range of topics related to human health and welfare. The friendly and comfortable ambience of Osler House is focused around a games room which has pool and table football facilities.

The college publishes a newsletter every term, called In Transit, as well as an annual Green Templeton College alumni magazine, called The GTC Magazine (formerly, albeit for Templeton College only, Templeton Views), and the college Graduate Common Room circulates a weekly electronic newsletter.

People associated with Green Templeton College

Principals

 Colin Bundy, First Principal of Green Templeton College
 Sir Richard Doll, epidemiologist, first Warden of Green College
 Michael Earl, Pro-Vice Chancellor of the University of Oxford
 Sir Crispin Tickell, diplomat and environmentalist, third Warden of Green College
 Michael von Clemm, American businessman, restaurateur, anthropologist, former President of Templeton College
 Lord Walton of Detchant, politician (life peer), second Warden of Green College

Fellows
 Kunal Basu, Indian-born British fiction author
 Dame Valerie Beral, Australian-born British epidemiologist
 Rory Collins, epidemiologist
 E. David Cook, theologian
 Sarah Darby, epidemiologist
 Sir Vernon Ellis, Barclay Fellow (2002–06) and Chair of the British Council
 Peter Friend, surgeon, Professor of Transplantation and Director of the Oxford Transplant Centre
 Anna Gloyn, geneticist & endocrinologist (2004-2022) 
 Sanjaya Lall, World Bank economist, Professor of Economics and Fellow of Green College
 John Lennox, Irish mathematician
 Sir Richard Peto, epidemiologist
 Stein Ringen, Norwegian sociologist and political scientist
 Rosemary Stewart, business theorist
 Steve Woolgar, sociologist

Notable alumni
 Ron Emerson, founding Chairman of the British Business Bank
 Derrick Gosselin, Belgian/Flemish engineer and economist
 Nancy Hubbard, American professor of business, former Associate Fellow of Templeton College
 Beverly Leon, former midfielder of Sunderland A.F.C. Ladies and CEO of Local Civics
 Stephen Robert Morse, journalist and film director/producer
 Baron von Pfetten, French Professor, Chairman of the Institute for East West Strategic Studies, former Ambassador and Senator
 Notis Mitarachi, EL Politician, Minister of Migration & Asylum (2020) of the Hellenic Republic, MP of the Hellenic Parliament, ex President of the Council of the European Union (Foreign Affairs - Trade) during the Hellenic Presidency, ex Deputy Minister for Economic Development and Competitiveness.

Gallery

See also
 Alumni of Green Templeton College
 Fellows of Green Templeton College

References

External links
 Green Templeton College website
 Green Templeton Boat Club Website

 
Colleges of the University of Oxford
Educational institutions established in 2008
2008 establishments in England
Buildings and structures of the University of Oxford
Buildings and structures in Oxford
Postgraduate schools in the United Kingdom